George Burnet Budge (1884 - 1962), was a Scottish international lawn bowler.

Bowls career
He won a bronze medal in the pairs at the 1954 British Empire and Commonwealth Games in Vancouver, with John Carswell.

Personal life
He was a company director by trade and lived in Dalry, North Ayrshire.

References

1884 births
1962 deaths
Bowls players at the 1954 British Empire and Commonwealth Games
Commonwealth Games medallists in lawn bowls
Commonwealth Games bronze medallists for Scotland
Scottish male bowls players
Medallists at the 1954 British Empire and Commonwealth Games